Spongiochloris spongiosa is a freshwater green alga species in the genus Spongiochloris.

Phenolic acids such as protocatechuic, p-hydroxybenzoic, 2,3-dihydroxybenzoic, chlorogenic, vanillic, caffeic, p-coumaric and salicylic acid, cinnamic acid and hydroxybenzaldehydes such as p-hydroxybenzaldehyde, 3,4-dihydroxybenzaldehyde and vanillin can be isolated from in vitro culture of S. spongiosa.

References

External links 
 NCBI Taxonomy browser
 AlgaeBase

Chlorococcaceae